Anthony Frederick Field (born 23 May 1942) is an English former footballer who played as a forward.

Fields made two appearances for Chester in The Football League late in the 1960–61 season, having been a product of the club's youth system. These proved to be his only first-team outings for the club and he moved to Southport but did not add any more league appearances to his name.

References

1942 births
Living people
Sportspeople from Chester
English footballers
English Football League players
Association football forwards
Chester City F.C. players
Southport F.C. players